The 1990 European Cup was the 26th edition of the European Cup, IIHF's premier European club ice hockey tournament. The season started on October 19, 1990, and finished on December 30, 1990.

The tournament was won by Djurgårdens IF, who beat Dynamo Moscow in the final.

First group round

Group A
(Sofia, Bulgaria)

Group A standings

Group B
(Bolzano, Italy)

Group B standings

Group C
(Rødovre, Denmark)

Group C standings

Group D
(Rouen, France)

Group D standings

 HC Lugano,
 Sparta Praha,
 TPS,
 Düsseldorfer EG    :  bye

Second group round

Group A
(Düsseldorf, North Rhine-Westphalia, Germany)

Group A standings

Group B
(Lugano, Ticino, Switzerland)

Group B standings

Final stage
(Düsseldorf, North Rhine-Westphalia, Germany)

Third round

Fifth place match

 Djurgårdens IF,
 Dynamo Moscow    :  bye

Semifinals

Third place match

Final

References
 Season 1990

1
IIHF European Cup